The Piendamó Fault is an oblique dextral strike-slip fault in the department of Cauca in southwestern Colombia.

Etymology 
The fault is named after Piendamó, Cauca.

Description 

The Piendamó Fault is part of Romeral Fault System in southwestern Colombia. The fault is located at the base of the mountain front of the western slope of the Central Ranges, north of the city of Popayán. The fault displaces volcanic pyroclastic deposits and mud flows of the Tertiary to Quaternary Popayán Formation. It forms an outstanding topographic and tectonic block bounded by two intersecting faults.

The fault forms an outstanding prismatic-tectonic mountain block composed of pyroclastic flow and ash-fall deposits. This block is bounded by two well developed fault scarps of about  height; one facing west-southwest and the other facing south-southwest. There is geomorphic evidence of scarp degradation and old landslides on the face of these scarps. Several close fault lines parallel the west-southwest-facing scarp.

See also 

 List of earthquakes in Colombia
 Rosas-Julumito Fault

References

Bibliography

Maps

Further reading 
 

Seismic faults of Colombia
Thrust faults
Strike-slip faults
Inactive faults
Faults